William Kentridge (born 28 April 1955) is a South African artist best known for his prints, drawings, and animated films, especially noted for a sequence of hand-drawn animated films he produced during the 1990s. The latter are constructed by filming a drawing, making erasures and changes, and filming it again. He continues this process meticulously, giving each change to the drawing a quarter of a second to two seconds' screen time. A single drawing will be altered and filmed this way until the end of a scene. These palimpsest-like drawings are later displayed along with the films as finished pieces of art.

Kentridge has created art work as part of design of theatrical productions, both plays and operas. He has served as art director and overall director of numerous productions, collaborating with other artists, puppeteers and others in creating productions that combine drawings and multi-media combinations.

Early life and career
Kentridge was born in Johannesburg in 1955 to Sydney Kentridge and Felicia Geffen, a Jewish family. Both were advocates (barristers) who represented people marginalized by the apartheid system. He was educated at King Edward VII School in Houghton, Johannesburg. He showed great artistic promise from an early age. In 2016 he became perhaps the first artist to have a catalogue raisonné devoted exclusively to his juvenilia.

He earned a Bachelor of Arts degree in Politics and African Studies at the University of the Witwatersrand and then a diploma in Fine Arts from the Johannesburg Art Foundation. In the early 1980s, he studied mime and theatre at the L'École Internationale de Théâtre Jacques Lecoq in Paris. He originally hoped to become an actor, but said later: "I was fortunate to discover at a theatre school that I was so bad an actor [... that] I was reduced to an artist, and I made my peace with it." Between 1975 and 1991, he was acting and directing with Johannesburg's Junction Avenue Theatre Company. In the 1980s, he worked on television films and series as an art director.

Work
Kentridge believed that being ethnically Jewish gave him a unique position as a third-party observer in South Africa. His parents were lawyers, well-known for their defence of victims of apartheid. Kentridge developed an ability to remove himself somewhat from the atrocities committed under the later regimes. The basics of South Africa's socio-political condition and history must be known to grasp his work fully, much the same as in the cases of such artists as Francisco Goya and Käthe Kollwitz.

Kentridge has practiced expressionist art: form often alludes to content and vice versa.  The feeling that is manipulated by the use of palette, composition and media, among others, often plays an equally vital role in the overall meaning as the subject and narrative of a given work. One must use one's gut reactions as well as one's interpretive skills to find meaning in Kentridge's work, much of which reveals very little content. Due to the sparse, rough and expressive qualities of Kentridge's handwriting, the viewer sees a sombre picture upon first glance, an impression that is perpetuated as the image illustrates a vulnerable and uncomfortable situation.

Aspects of social injustice that have transpired over the years in South Africa have often become fodder for Kentridge's pieces. Casspirs Full of Love, viewable at the Metropolitan Museum of Art, appears to be nothing more than heads in boxes to the average American viewer, but South Africans know that a casspir is a vehicle used to put down riots, a kind of a crowd-control tank.

The title, Casspirs Full of Love, written along the side of the print, is suggestive of the narrative and is oxymoronic. A casspir full of love is much like a bomb that bursts with happiness – it is an intangible improbability. The purpose of a machine such as this is to instil "peace" by force, but Kentridge noted that it was used as a tool to keep lower-class natives from taking colonial power and money.

Prints and drawings

By the mid-1970s, Kentridge was making prints and drawings. In 1979, he created 20 to 30 monotypes, which soon became known as the "Pit" series. In 1980, he executed about 50 small-format etchings which he called the "Domestic Scenes". These two extraordinary groups of prints served to establish Kentridge's artistic identity, an identity he has continued to develop in various media. Despite his ongoing exploration of non-traditional media, the foundation of his art has always been drawing and printmaking.

In 1986, he began a group of charcoal and pastel drawings based, very tenuously, on Watteau's Embarkation for Cythera.  These extremely important works, the best of which reflect a blasted, dystopic urban landscape, demonstrate the artist's growing consciousness of the flexibility of space and movement.

In 1996–1997, he produced a portfolio of eight prints titled Ubu Tells the Truth, based on Alfred Jarry's 1896 play Ubu Roi.  These prints also relate to the Truth and Reconciliation Commission conducted in South Africa after the end of apartheid. One of the stark and somber prints from this portfolio, in the collection of the Honolulu Museum of Art, is illustrated.

The Six Drawing Lessons, delivered as part of The Norton Lectures series at Harvard University in 2012, consider the work in the studio and the studio as a place of making meaning developed.  A series of large drawings of trees in Indian ink on found encyclopedia pages, torn up and reassembled, analyzes the form of different trees indigenous to southern Africa. Drawn across multiple pages from books, each drawing is put together as a puzzle – the single pages first painted, then the whole pieced together.

"My drawings don't start with a 'beautiful mark'," writes Kentridge, thinking about the activity of printmaking as being about getting the hand to lead the brain, rather than letting the brain lead the hand. "It has to be a mark of something out there in the world. It doesn't have to be an accurate drawing, but it has to stand for an observation, not something that is abstract, like an emotion."

Animated films
Between 1989 and 2003 Kentridge made a series of nine short films, which he eventually gathered under the title 9 Drawings for Projection. In 1989, he began the first of those animated movies, Johannesburg, 2nd Greatest City After Paris. The series runs through Monument (1990), Mine (1991), Sobriety, Obesity & Growing Old (1991), Felix in Exile (1994), History of the Main Complaint (1996), Weighing and Wanting (1997), and Stereoscope (1999), up to Tide Table (2003) and Other Faces, 2011.

For the series, he used a technique that would become a feature of his work – successive charcoal drawings, always on the same sheet of paper, contrary to the traditional animation technique in which each movement is drawn on a separate sheet.  In this way, Kentridge's videos and films came to keep the traces of the previous drawings. His animations deal with political and social themes from a personal and, at times, autobiographical point of view, since the author includes his self-portrait in many of his works.

The political content and unique techniques of Kentridge's work have propelled him into the realm of South Africa's top artists.  Working with what is in essence a very restrictive media, using only charcoal and a touch of blue or red pastel, he has created animations of astounding depth.  A theme running through all of his work is his peculiar way of representing his birthplace.  While he does not portray it as the militant or oppressive place that it was for black people, he does not emphasise the picturesque state of living that white people enjoyed during apartheid either; he presents instead a city in which the duality of man is exposed. In a series of nine short films, he introduces two characters – Soho Eckstein and Felix Teitlebaum.  These characters depict an emotional and political struggle that ultimately reflects the lives of many South Africans in the pre-democracy era.

In an introductory note to Felix In Exile, Kentridge writes, 
"In the same way that there is a human act of dismembering the past there is a natural process in the terrain through erosion, growth, dilapidation that also seeks to blot out events. In South Africa this process has other dimensions. The very term 'new South Africa' has within it the idea of a painting over the old, the natural process of dismembering, the naturalization of things new."

Not only in Felix In Exile but in all his animated works, the concepts of time and change comprise a major theme. He conveys it through his erasure technique, which contrasts with conventional cel-shaded animation, whose seamlessness de-emphasizes the fact that it is actually a succession of hand-drawn images. This he implements by drawing a key frame, erasing certain areas of it, re-drawing them and thus creating the next frame. He is able in this way to create as many frames as he wants based on the original key frame simply by erasing small sections.  Traces of what has been erased are still visible to the viewer; as the films unfold, a sense of fading memory or the passing of time and the traces it leaves behind are portrayed. Kentridge's technique grapples with what is not said, what remains suppressed or forgotten but can easily be felt.

In the nine films that follow Soho Eckstein's life, an increasing vehemence is placed on the health of the individual and contemporary South African society. Conflicts between anarchic and bourgeois individualistic beliefs, again a reference to the duality of man, indicate the idea of social revolution by poetically disfiguring surrounding buildings and landscapes. Kentridge states that, although his work does not focus on apartheid in a direct and overt manner, but on the contemporary state of Johannesburg, his drawings and films are certainly influenced by the brutalised society that resulted from the regime.

As for more direct political issues, Kentridge says his art presents ambiguity, contradiction, uncompleted movements and uncertain endings, all of which seem like insignificant subtleties but can be attributed to most of the calamity presented in his work. In a mixed-media triptych entitled The Boating Party (1985), based on Renoir's painting of a similar name, the havoc caused by a seemingly-uninterested aristocracy is perhaps his most severe comment on the state of South Africa during apartheid.  The languid diners sit at ease while the surrounding area is ravaged, torn and burned, a contrast that is reflected in his style and choice of colours.

In 1988, Kentridge co-founded Free Film-makers Co-Operative in Johannesburg. In 1999, he was appointed a film-maker by Stereoscope. 
"Purely in the context of my own work," he wrote in a published playscript of his celebrated Ubu and the Truth Commission, "I would repeat my trust in the contingent, the inauthentic, the whim, the practical, as strategies for finding meaning.  I would repeat my mistrust in the worth of Good Ideas. And state a belief that somewhere between relying on pure chance on the one hand, and the execution of a programme on the other, lies the most uncertain but the most fertile ground for the work we do [...]. I think I have shown that it is not the clear light of reason or even aesthetic sensibility which determines how one works, but a constellation of factors only some of which we can change at will."In 2001, Creative Time aired his film Shadow Procession on the NBC Astrovision Panasonic screen in Times Square.

Opera
Kentridge has been commissioned to create stage design and act as a theatre director in opera. His political perspective is expressed in his opera directions, which involves different layers: stage direction, animation movies, and influences of the puppet world. He has staged Il ritorno d'Ulisse in patria (Monteverdi), Die Zauberflöte (Mozart) and The Nose (Shostakovich). Following the last work, he collaborated with the French composer François Sarhan on a short show called Telegrams from the Nose, for which he made the stage and set design for the performance.

In November 2015 his "provocative and visually stunning new staging" of Berg's Lulu, premièred at the Metropolitan Opera in New York, a co-production with the English National Opera and the Dutch National Opera. On 8 August 2017, William Kentridge's Wozzeck (Alban Berg) premièred at the Salzburg Festival and received enthusiastic reactions. "The Head and the Load", Holland Festival, Amsterdam 2019

Tapestries
Kentridge's protean artistic investigation continues in his series of tapestries begun in 2001. The tapestries stem from a series of drawings in which he conjured shadowy figures from ripped construction paper; he made a collage of these with the web-like background of nineteenth-century atlas maps. To adapt these figures as tapestry, Kentridge worked in close collaboration with the Johannesburg-based Stephens Tapestry Studio, mapping cartoons from enlarged photographs of the drawings and hand-picking dyes to colour the locally spun mohair (goat hair).

Sculpture
In 2009, Kentridge, in partnership with Gerhard Marx, created a 10m-tall sculpture for his home city of Johannesburg entitled Fire Walker. In 2012 his sculpture, Il cavaliere di Toledo, was unveiled in Naples. Rebus (2013), referring in title to the allusional device using pictures to represent words or parts of words, is a series of bronze sculptures that form two distinct images when turned to a certain angle; when paired in correspondence, for example, a final image – a nude – is created from two original forms – a stamp and a telephone.

Murals
In 2016, the anniversary of Rome's legendary founding in 753BC, Kentridge unveiled Triumphs and Laments, a monumental mural along the right bank of the river Tiber. The 550m-long frieze depicting a procession of more than 80 figures from Roman mythology to the present is Kentridge’s largest public work to date. To celebrate its launch, he and his long-time collaborator, the composer Philip Miller, devised a series of performances featuring live shadow play and more than 40 musicians.

Family 
Kentridge is married to Anne Stanwix, a rheumatologist, and they have three children. A third-generation South African of Lithuanian-Jewish heritage, he is the son of the South African lawyer Sydney Kentridge and the lawyer and activist Felicia Kentridge.

Films 

Kentridge's films were shown at the 2004 Cannes Film Festival.

Exhibitions

Collections
Kentridge's works are included in the following permanent collections: Honolulu Museum of Art, the Kalamazoo Institute of Arts, the Museum of Contemporary Art, Chicago, the Museum of Modern Art (New York), and the Tate Modern (London).  An edition of the five-channel video installation The Refusal of Time (2012), which debuted at documenta 13, was jointly acquired by the Metropolitan Museum of Art in New York and the San Francisco Museum of Modern Art. In 2015, Kentridge gave the definitive collection of his archive and art – films, videos and digital works – to the George Eastman Museum, one of the world's largest and oldest photography and film collections.

Awards

Kentridge's Five Themes exhibit was included in the 2009 Time 100, an annual list of the one hundred top people and events in the world. That same year, the exhibition was awarded First Place in the 2009 AICA (International Association of Art Critics Awards) Best Monographic Museum Show Nationally category.

In 2012, Kentridge was in residence at Harvard University invited to deliver the distinguished Charles Eliot Norton lectures in early 2012.
 That same year, he was elected to the American Philosophical Society.

Art market
Kentridge's artworks are among the most sought-after and expensive works in South Africa: "a major charcoal drawing by world-renowned South African artist William Kentridge could set you back some £250,000". Kentridge is represented by Goodman Gallery and Marian Goodman Gallery in New York and Lia Rumma Gallery in Italy.

The South African record for Kentridge is R6.6 million ($320,000), set at Aspire Art Auctions in Johannesburg in 2018. One of his works reached $600,000 at Sotheby's New York in 2011.

Notes

References 
 Cameron, Dan; Christov-Bakargiev, Carolyn; Coetzee, JM. William Kentridge. New York: Phaidon Press, 1999.
 Christov-Bakargiev, Carolyn. William Kentridge. Societé des Expositions du Palais de Beaux-Arts de Bruxelles, 1998.
 Cole, William.  "On Some Early Prints by William Kentridge", Print Quarterly vol. XXVI no. 3 (2009), 268–273.
 Cole, William.  "Privileged Access, Judiciously Shared.  Matthew Kentridge, The Soho Chronicles:  10 Films by William Kentridge." Art Journal vol. 74, no. 4 (winter 2015).
 Cole, William.  The Juvenilia of William Kentridge:  An Unauthorized Catalogue Raisonné. Sitges: Cole & Contreras, 2016.
 Coumans, Sandra. "Geschichte und Identität. Black Box / Chambre noire von William Kentridge", Regiospectra Verlag Berlin, 2012.
 Edmunds, Paul. "William Kentridge's SANG Retrospective", Artthrob: Contemporary Art in South Africa 65 (2003).
 Greg Kucera Gallery. "William Kentridge". 2007.
 
 Kentridge, William. "Director's Note". In Ubu and the Truth Commission, by Jane Taylor, viii-xv. Cape Town: University of Cape Town Press, 2007.
 
 Taylor, Jane. Ubu and the Truth Commission. Cape Town: University of Cape Town Press, 2007.

External links 
Kentridge Studio - Official site for William Kentridge
William Kentridge at Goodman Gallery
William Kentridge: The Refusal of Time at The Metropolitan Museum of Art
Artworks by William Kentridge
Interview with William Kentridge, by Lilian Tone
William Kentridge believes South Africa let Nelson Mandela down, Interview with William Kentridge, by Flavia Foradini, The Art Newspaper, online edition, 13 Dec 2013
How We Make Sense of the World. An interview with William Kentridge Video by Louisiana Channel
culturebase: William Kentridge

1955 births
Living people
Kyoto laureates in Arts and Philosophy
South African Jews
South African animators
Jewish artists
Fellows of the American Academy of Arts and Sciences
University of the Witwatersrand alumni
South African contemporary artists
L'École Internationale de Théâtre Jacques Lecoq alumni
Honorary Members of the Royal Academy
21st-century South African male artists
20th-century South African male artists
Members of the American Philosophical Society